Baron Milverton, of Lagos and of Clifton in the City of Bristol, is a title in the Peerage of the United Kingdom. It was created on 10 October 1947 for the colonial administrator Sir Arthur Richards. He had previously served as Governor of Nigeria.  the title is held by his eldest son, the second Baron, who succeeded in 1978.

Barons Milverton (1947)
Arthur Frederick Richards, 1st Baron Milverton (1885–1978)
Fraser Arthur Richard Richards, 2nd Baron Milverton (b. 1930)

The heir presumptive is the present holder's brother, the Honourable Michael Hugh Richards (b. 1936)
The heir presumptive's heir and last heir to the title is his son  Arthur Hugh Richards (b. 1963)

Arms

References

Baronies in the Peerage of the United Kingdom
Noble titles created in 1947